There is at least one named lake and reservoir in Wibaux County, Montana.

Lakes

Reservoirs
 Lamesteer Reservoir, el.

See also
 List of lakes in Montana

Notes

Bodies of water of Wibaux County, Montana
Wilbaux